Aubryists is the name given to members of the Socialist Party of France who support Martine Aubry, the party's first secretary from 2008 to 2012. It is also known as the Réformer club.

Notable Aubryists include François Lamy, Marylise Lebranchu and Adeline Hazan. Historically, the Aubryist faction is descended from the faction of the New Left which did not join the New Socialist Party. The Aubryists supported François Hollande's leadership.

Aubryists are generally part of the party's left-wing, though many are known as Christian socialists. They grew in number in 2011 after the announcement of Aubry's candidacy in the 2011 Socialist primary for the 2012 French presidential election.

External links
Official site of Réformer

Factions of the Socialist Party (France)
Political party factions in France